() is a municipality and village in Frýdek-Místek District in the Moravian-Silesian Region of the Czech Republic. It has about 300 inhabitants.

Geography
It is the second easternmost municipality of the country (after neighboring Bukovec). The tripoint of the Czech Republic, Poland and Slovakia is located in the municipality.

Hrčava is situated in a hilly landscape of the Jablunkov Intermontane range.

History
The first written mention of Hrčava is from 1645 as Hertiava, when Hungarian fortifications were built here. It was initially a hamlet administered by Jaworzynka, which belonged then to the Duchy of Teschen, a fee of Kingdom of Bohemia.

After World War I, Polish–Czechoslovak War and the division of Cieszyn Silesia in 1920, Jaworzynka with Hrčava became a part of Poland. In June 1921, Hrčava was temporarily annexed again to Czechoslovakia, but still was a part of Jaworzynka. In June 1924, it became a separate hamlet with a special legal status, administered by the district council. The municipality of Hrčava was established in October 1927.

Following the Munich Agreement, in October 1938 together with the Zaolzie region they were annexed by Poland, administratively adjoined to Cieszyn County of Silesian Voivodeship. They were then annexed by Nazi Germany at the beginning of World War II. After the war it was restored to Czechoslovakia.

Sights
The landmark of Hrčava is the Church of Saints Cyril and Methodius. It dates from 1936 and it is the youngest wooden church in the region.

References

External links

 

Villages in Frýdek-Místek District
Cieszyn Silesia